Cotoneaster integerrimus, the common cotoneaster, is a species of Cotoneaster native to central and eastern Europe and southwest Asia, from southern Belgium and eastern France south to Italy, and east through Germany to the Balkans, northern Turkey, the Crimea, the Caucasus and northern Iran; plants in Spain may also belong in this species. In the past, it was treated in a wider sense, including plants from Wales now split off as Cotoneaster cambricus and plants from Scandinavia now treated as Cotoneaster scandinavicus, but differs from these in genetic profile and detail of foliage and fruit.

The flowers are produced in corymbs of one to four (occasionally up to seven) together in mid spring, each flower  diameter, with five white to pale pink petals. The fruit is a dark red pome  diameter, containing two or three seeds. It occurs on limestone soils, at altitudes of up to  altitude.

Nomenclature
The genus name Cotoneaster comes from Latin cotone, quince, and the suffix -aster, meaning resembling. Cotone is a masculine noun, though in some older works it was wrongly treated as feminine, resulting in different name endings for many of the species, such as Cotoneaster integerrima instead of Cotoneaster integerrimus. The International Code of Botanical Nomenclature (articles 23.5 and 32.7 in the 2007 Vienna code) specifies that such names are not invalid, but are to be corrected without altering the author or date of publication.

References

integerrimus
Flora of Europe